Joseph Marie Tchango (born 28 November 1978) is a Cameroonian former professional footballer who played as a midfielder.

References

External links
 
 

Living people
1975 births
Association football midfielders
Cameroonian footballers
Elite One players
Liga MX players
Süper Lig players
Coton Sport FC de Garoua players
Tecos F.C. footballers
Liverpool F.C. (Montevideo) players
MKE Ankaragücü footballers
Cameroon international footballers
1996 African Cup of Nations players
Expatriate footballers in Turkey
Cameroonian expatriate sportspeople in Turkey
Expatriate footballers in Mexico
Cameroonian expatriate sportspeople in Mexico